Amatopo Airstrip  is an airstrip located near Amatopo in Suriname.

Charters and destinations 
Airlines providing charter flights to this airport are:

Incidents and accidents 
 On 14 November 1976, a de Havilland Canada DHC6-100 Twin Otter, registered PZ-TAV of the Surinaamse Luchtvaart Maatschappij was involved in a freak incident at the Amatopo Airstrip. The co-pilot, M. van Waveren, was killed when he walked into the running propeller after the landing. The plane was piloted by G. Brunings.

Tourism
From the airstrip there is a tour starting with an 800-meter walk through the rainforest, and then transported by dugout canoe (about 30 minute boat trip) to beautiful Arapahu Island on the Corantijn River, where tourist lodges are available.

See also

 List of airports in Suriname
 Transport in Suriname

References

External links
OpenStreetMap - Amatopo Airstrip

Airports in Suriname